Chittenden County may refer to:

Places
Chittenden County, Vermont

Ships
USS Chittenden County (LST-561), a United States Navy tank landing ship in commission as USS LST-561 from 1944 to 1946 and 1950 to 1955 and as USS Chittenden County from 1955 to 1958